Fairview is a small census-designated place on the boundary between Christian and Todd counties in the western part of the U.S. state of Kentucky. As of the 2010 census, it had a population of 286, with 186 living in Christian County and 100 living in Todd County. It is chiefly notable as the birthplace of Jefferson Davis, later President of the Confederate States of America, and as the location of the Jefferson Davis State Historic Site.

History
The community was likely first established by Samuel Davis, a Revolutionary War veteran who settled on the Todd County side around 1793. Davis opened the first post office there on October 1, 1802, naming the locale "Davisburg."  His son, Jefferson Davis, the future President of the Confederate States of America, was born here on June 3, 1808.

The Davis family remained in the area until 1810, when they relocated to the Bayou Teche in St. Mary Parish, Louisiana. The community was later known as "Georgetown" after local tavern keeper George Nichols. The town was incorporated as "Fairview" on February 6, 1846; the Fairview Post Office opened on the Christian County side on June 8. The post office moved back and forth between Christian and Todd counties over the years; in the early 1980s it was located on the Christian County side.

In the 1880s ten Fairview locals purchased the old Davis property as a new home for Bethel Baptist Church. Working with Jefferson Davis, the buyers ceremonially deeded the lot to him, and he in turn donated it to Bethel Baptist Church on March 10, 1886. The old Davis homestead was demolished and replaced with a new Gothic Revival church. This burned down in 1900, and the present building was erected on the site the following year.

In 1917, construction of the Jefferson Davis State Historic Site began. It was completed in 1924.

Geography
The community is part of the Clarksville, TN–KY Metropolitan Statistical Area.

Demographics

References

External links
 "Fairview", Kentucky Atlas and Gazetteer, University of Kentucky
 Entry at CityTownInfo.com 

Census-designated places in Kentucky
Census-designated places in Christian County, Kentucky
Census-designated places in Todd County, Kentucky
Clarksville metropolitan area
Populated places established in 1793